In mathematics and physics, many topics are named in honor of Swiss mathematician Leonhard Euler (1707–1783), who made many important discoveries and innovations. Many of these items named after Euler include their own unique function, equation, formula, identity, number (single or sequence), or other mathematical entity. Many of these entities have been given simple and ambiguous names such as Euler's function, Euler's equation, and Euler's formula.

Euler's work touched upon so many fields that he is often the earliest written reference on a given matter. In an effort to avoid naming everything after Euler, some discoveries and theorems are attributed to the first person to have proved them after Euler.

Conjectures
Euler's conjecture (Waring's problem) 
Euler's sum of powers conjecture
Euler's Graeco-Latin square conjecture

Equations
Usually, Euler's equation refers to one of (or a set of) differential equations (DEs). It is customary to classify them into ODEs and PDEs.

Otherwise, Euler's equation may refer to a non-differential equation, as in these three cases:
Euler–Lotka equation, a characteristic equation employed in mathematical demography
Euler's pump and turbine equation
Euler transform used to accelerate the convergence of an alternating series and is also frequently applied to the hypergeometric series

Ordinary differential equations
Euler rotation equations, a set of first-order ODEs concerning the rotations of a rigid body.
Euler–Cauchy equation, a linear equidimensional second-order ODE with variable coefficients. Its second-order version can emerge from Laplace equation in polar coordinates.
Euler–Bernoulli beam equation, a fourth-order ODE concerning the elasticity of structural beams.
Euler's differential equation, a first order nonlinear ordinary differential equation

Partial differential equations
Euler conservation equations, a set of quasilinear first-order hyperbolic equations used in fluid dynamics for inviscid flows. In the (Froude) limit of no external field, they are conservation equations.
Euler–Tricomi equation – a second-order PDE emerging from Euler conservation equations.
Euler–Poisson–Darboux equation, a second-order PDE playing important role in solving the wave equation.
Euler–Lagrange equation, a second-order PDE emerging from minimization problems in calculus of variations.

Formulas

Functions
The Euler function, a modular form that is a prototypical q-series.
Euler's totient function (or Euler phi (φ) function) in number theory, counting the number of coprime integers less than an integer.
Euler hypergeometric integral
Euler–Riemann zeta function

Identities
Euler's identity . 
Euler's four-square identity, which shows that the product of two sums of four squares can itself be expressed as the sum of four squares.
Euler's identity may also refer to the  pentagonal number theorem.

Numbers
Euler's number, the base of the natural logarithm
Euler's idoneal numbers, a set of 65 or possibly 66 or 67 integers with special properties

Eulerian numbers count certain types of permutations.
Euler number (physics), the cavitation number in fluid dynamics.
Euler number (algebraic topology) – now, Euler characteristic, classically the number of vertices minus edges plus faces of a polyhedron.
Euler number (3-manifold topology) – see Seifert fiber space
Lucky numbers of Euler
Euler's constant gamma (γ), also known as the Euler–Mascheroni constant
Eulerian integers, more commonly called Eisenstein integers, the algebraic integers of form  where  is a complex cube root of 1.
Euler–Gompertz constant

Theorems

Laws

Euler's first law, the linear momentum of a body is equal to the product of the mass of the body and the velocity of its center of mass.
Euler's second law, the sum of the external moments about a point is equal to the rate of change of angular momentum about that point.

Other things

Topics by field of study
Selected topics from above, grouped by subject, and additional topics from the fields of music and physical systems

Analysis: derivatives, integrals, and logarithms

Geometry and spatial arrangement

Graph theory
Euler characteristic (formerly called Euler number) in algebraic topology and topological graph theory, and the corresponding Euler's formula 
Eulerian circuit, Euler cycle or Eulerian path – a path through a graph that takes each edge once
Eulerian graph has all its vertices spanned by an Eulerian path
Euler class
Euler diagram – incorrectly, but more popularly, known as Venn diagrams, its subclass
Euler tour technique

Music
Euler–Fokker genus
Euler's tritone

Number theory
Euler's criterion – quadratic residues modulo by primes
Euler product – infinite product expansion, indexed by prime numbers of a Dirichlet series
Euler pseudoprime
Euler–Jacobi pseudoprime
Euler's totient function (or Euler phi (φ) function) in number theory, counting the number of coprime integers less than an integer.
Euler system
Euler's factorization method

Physical systems

Polynomials
Euler's homogeneous function theorem, a theorem about homogeneous polynomials.
Euler polynomials
Euler spline – splines composed of arcs using Euler polynomials

See also
Contributions of Leonhard Euler to mathematics

Notes

Euler
Leonhard Euler